John Henry Austin Wallace (30 March 1924 – 15 September 2008) was a first-class cricketer who played for Rhodesia in the Currie Cup from 1949 to 1954.

Wallace, a right-handed batsman, was the only Rhodesian to pass 500 runs in the 1951/52 Currie Cup season. He had particular success against North Eastern Transvaal during his career, making 424 runs at 60.57 against them in four first-class matches and scoring two centuries. The other two centuries he made for Rhodesia came against Orange Free State and Border. He was also dismissed in the 90s on three occasions.

His son Peter played four first-class matches between 1978 and 1983.

References

External links
CricketArchive (Lists incorrectly his birthplace as being in Zimbabwe)
Cricinfo

1924 births
2008 deaths
People from Mnquma Local Municipality
South African people of British descent
White South African people
Zimbabwean cricketers
South African cricketers
Rhodesia cricketers
South African emigrants to Rhodesia